Natal Air Force Base – ALA10  is a base of the Brazilian Air Force, located in Parnamirim, near Natal, Brazil.

History
Originally called Parnamirim Airport, this facility had an important role during World War II as a strategic base for aircraft flying between South America and West Africa. Particularly between 1943 and 1945, the base was used jointly by the Brazilian Air Force, United States Army and United States Navy, the Royal Air Force, and commercial airlines. The maintenance and security installations were made by the U.S. Army in the South Atlantic (USAFSA).

It shared some facilities with Augusto Severo International Airport until 31 May 2014.

Units
The following units are based at Natal Air Force Base:
 1st Squadron of the 5th Aviation Group (1º/5ºGAv) Rumba, using the C-95BM & CM Bandeirante.
 2nd Squadron of the 5th Aviation Group (2º/5ºGAv) Joker, using the A-29A Super Tucano.
 1st Squadron of the 8th Aviation Group (1º/8ºGAv) Falcão, using the H-36 Caracal.
 1st Squadron of the 11th Aviation Group (1º/11ºGav) Gavião, using the H-50 Esquilo.
 2nd Squadron of Air Transportation (2°ETA) Pastor, using the C-95B & BM Bandeirante, C-97 Brasília, and C-98A Caravan.
 3rd Squadron of the 1st Communications and Control Group (3º/1ºGCC) Morcego, using radars and equipment for air defense.

Accidents and incidents
25 March 1961: Brazilian Air Force, a Douglas C-47 Skytrain registration FAB-2055 flying from Rio de Janeiro to Natal crashed upon final approach. Of the 28 passengers and crew, 5 survived.
23 April 1977: Brazilian Air Force, an Embraer C-95 Bandeirante registration FAB-2169 crashed upon landing at Natal.
3 July 1977: Brazilian Air Force, an Embraer C-95 Bandeirante registration FAB-2157 crashed after take-off from Natal. All 18 occupants died.

Access
The base is located 18 km from downtown Natal.

Gallery
This gallery displays aircraft that are or have been based at Natal. The gallery is not comprehensive.

Present aircraft

Retired aircraft

See also
List of Brazilian military bases
Augusto Severo International Airport

References

External links

Rio Grande do Norte
Brazilian Air Force
Brazilian Air Force bases
Buildings and structures in Rio Grande do Norte
Natal, Rio Grande do Norte
Airfields of the United States Army Air Forces Air Transport Command on the South Atlantic Route